Camden Hills State Park is a   public recreation area overlooking Penobscot Bay in the town of Camden, Knox County, Maine. The state park features multi-use trails to Mount Battie, Mount Megunticook, and other scenic locales. The park is managed by the Maine Department of Agriculture, Conservation and Forestry.

History
The park was developed during the 1930s by the Civilian Conservation Corps working at the direction of the National Park Service. The Camden Hills CCC camp was in operation from June 1935 to September 1941 creating roads, trails, buildings, and recreational facilities. The land was turned over to the state in 1947. The Mount Battie Auto Road was completed in 1965. The Maine Conservation Corps added a stone staircase for ocean access in 1990.

Activities and amenities
The park is crossed by numerous trails for hiking, horseback riding, mountain biking, cross-country skiing, snowmobiling, and snowshoeing. The trail up  Mount Megunticook leads to the tallest peak in the park. The mile-long Maiden Cliff Trail ends at a monument to 12-year-old Elenora French, whose misadventure in 1864 gave the site its name. The park also offers opportunities for hunting and camping as well as rock climbing.

References

External links
Camden Hills State Park Department of Agriculture, Conservation and Forestry
Camden Hills State Park Map Department of Agriculture, Conservation and Forestry

State parks of Maine
State parks of the Appalachians
Protected areas of Knox County, Maine
Camden, Maine
Campgrounds in Maine
1947 establishments in Maine
Protected areas established in 1947
Civilian Conservation Corps camps